The 14707 / 14708 Ranakpur Express is an express train belonging to Indian Railways that runs between  and  in India. It operates as train number 14707 from Bikaner to Dadar and as train number 14708 in the reverse direction.

It is named after the village of Ranakpur which is located in the Pali district of Rajasthan.

Coaches

The 14707/14708 Ranakpur Express presently has 1 AC 2 tier, 4 AC 3 tier, 13 Sleeper Class 4 General Unreserved coaches & 2 seating cum luggage rake.

As with most train services in India, coach composition may be amended at the discretion of Indian Railways depending on demand.

Service

The 14707 Ranakpur Express covers the distance of 1218 kilometres in 23 hours 20 mins (52 km/hr) & 1218 kilometres in 22 hours 55 mins as 14708 Ranakpur Express (53 km/hr).

Route & Halts

Schedule

Traction

Prior to Western Railway switching to the AC traction, it would be hauled by a WCAM-1 engine until  after which a Vadodara-based WAP-4 and WAP-5 and WAP-7 would haul the train until  following which it would get a WDP-4 / WDP-4B / WDP-4D from the Bhagat Ki Kothi shed until Bikaner Junction.

Since Western Railway switched over to AC traction in February 2012, it is now hauled by a WAP-5 / WAP-4E / WAP-7 locomotive  from the Vadodara shed until  after which a WDP-4 / WDP-4B / WDP-4D locomotive from the Bhagat Ki Kothi shed takes over until .

Gallery

In popular culture
The train was mentioned in The Big Bang Theory, Season 2, Episode 17 ("The Terminator Decoupling").

References 

Transport in Bikaner
Transport in Mumbai
Railway services introduced in 1998
Named passenger trains of India
Rail transport in Maharashtra
Rail transport in Gujarat
Rail transport in Rajasthan
Express trains in India